Wajiha Rastagar (Persian:وجيهه رستگار) born 12 May 1967, is a singer from Afghanistan. She is wife to fellow singer and composer Farid Rastagar. She sings in Persian and Pashto, She currently lives in Germany along with her husband & children, and she continues her career from there. Wajiha Rastagar was a student of primary school when she participated in the school’s cultural programmes.

In the mid 1980s she and her band experimented with Synthesizers and therefore the sound of her music at that time had a lot of influence of British and American new wave bands like A flock of seagulls or Missing Persons.

She married Farid Rastagar, who was the music arranger and singer in GULI SURKH. Wajiha Rastagar has been singing a number of Afghanistan’s songs among which range some Afghani folksongs.  She came into focus again when she performed her album Delk-i-khoshbawar very nice. Delk-i-khoshbawar won the bestseller award in 2003 from KHORASAN MUSIC. Wajiha Rastagar has received the title of the Best singer of the year in Afghanistan and in Europe.

Farid And Wajiha have been living in exile in Germany since 1992. They have released 5 CDs and music videos in exile and have had more than 40 concerts since 1993 in Europe, Australia USA and Canada.
Hadia Rastagar is the 7-year-old daughter of Wajiha and Farid Rastagar. She is the singer of ALOCHA album the first song Album for children of Afghanistan. She is playing keyboard and Zerbaghali.

Festivals and concerts International music festival: Berlin 1981 Czechoslovakia international music festival 1082 Asian music festival in Tajikistan - 1986 Artist festival of ghazal, pop and classic music in India - 1984 World music festival in Moscow - 1984 Asian festival of Uzbekistan / Tajikistan - 1986 Pop music concert in central Asia - 1987 International Asian concert in Kazakhstan (Voice of Asia) - 1988 International youth festival in Korea - 1989 Asian concert in Samarkand and Bokhara ( Uzbekistan ), 1990 Asian festival in Turkey, 1991 Concert for helping Afghanistan ’s children in Sweden for Afghan PEN club - 2000 Live concert in BBC - 2002

Albums 
Rahi dor 
Khana-i- del 
Delak-i-khoshbawar 
Hadia 
Dar parda hai saz 
Alocha – first song Album for Afghanistan ’s children

International tours 
1981: International Music Festival in Berlin, Germany
1982: International Music Festival in Czech Republic
1983: Asian Festival in Tajikistan
1984: Indian Ghazal & Classic Music Festival in India
1985: World Festival in Moscow, Russia
1986: Asian Festival Of Uzbekistan & Tajikistan in Tajikistan
1987: Pop Music Concert in Middle East
1989: International Asian concert in Kazakhstan 
1990  Asian festival in Turkey
Beside these she has appeared in numerous concerts with her husband in many parts of the world including London, Germany, and Canada.

References

External links
 Official website of Wajiha and Farid Rastagar
 Farid and Wajiha Rastagar's MySpace
 Interview with freemuse
 Interview with noz

1967 births
Living people
Afghan musicians
People from Kabul
Afghan Tajik people
Afghan women singers
Persian-language singers
Afghan expatriates in Germany
20th-century Afghan women singers